Surendra Chaturvedi (1929–1977) was a journalist and activist prominent in the post-independence Indian cultural movement of the 1960s and 1970s when India saw a gradual increase in cultural freedom, quality of life, and means of expression, such as literature, fine arts and journalism.  Poetry, drama, historical plays and paintings received great impetus.  The number of newspapers, magazines and radio increased, with greater acceptance of vernacular and regional media.

Early life and education 

Born at Rajnandgaon in Chhattisgarh on 15 October 1929, Surendra had his early education at Sikandarpur (District Farukhabad), Gwalior and Holipura in District Agra.  His father Kalika Prasad Chaturvedi was a civil contractor, a Gandhian, and a fan of poems eulogising patriotism and valour.  Due to his father's emphasis on reading, the boy developed an interest in novels, short stories, plays, other fiction and poetry.  His sister Pramilla was a student of Hindi literature.

Chaturvedi attended Agra and Allahabad universities.  Drawn to Parimal and its cultural society, he took active part in all the plays staged under its banner and was recognised for an inborn flair for parody and mimicry. The society was under the patronage of famous poet Harivansh Rai Bachchan, his wife Teji Bachchan and Dharam Veer Bharti. He also attended University of Lucknow for further studies.

In 1954 he sailed for Glasgow, Scotland to take study management.  Once in England, Chaturvedi participated in BBC cultural programmes. He returned to India in 1958.

Journalism 

Chaturvedi worked for the Bennett Coleman and Company, first in the Public Relations department and then in the print media wing.

Chaturvedi was invited to take the role of the anchor at the historic inaugural show of Doordarshan (State TV Channel) on 15 September 1959.  He was one of the earliest anchors of the small screen in Lucknow. UP Natak Academy often called him to assess their plays.

Navbharat Times, a sister publication in Hindi of the Times of India, posted Chaturvedi as a special correspondent in 1960 to Lucknow, the capital of Uttar Pradesh. He reported objectively and frankly on interviews and press conferences of province and state leaders.

While at Navbharat Times, Chaturvedi sat on the Board of Advisors for the Institute of Creative Studies, a TV News and film Production Company established in 1974. Known for his ready humour, he was also a member of the Uttar Pradesh Press Club, which was established in 1956. Chaturvedi was known as one of Lucknow's "eminent journalists".

Poetry and fine arts 

Surendra excelled in muktaks (short poems).  He was popular at Kavi sammelan and Mushaira gatherings due to his witty and satirical manner and subject matter. He usually targeted politicians, inefficient and corrupt bureaucrats and orthodox society norms.

Top writers, dramatists and poets were his close friends, such as Dr. Dharamvir Bharati, Amritlal Nagar, Dr. Nagendra, Bhagwati Charan Verma, Yash Pal, Kamleshwar, Giridhar Gopal, Shivani, Dushyant Kumar and Sri Lal Shukla. Stalwarts of music and dance like Begum Akhtar, Birju Maharaj and Shambhu Maharaj often invited him for their performances or renderings.

In the later part of his life Surendra developed an interest in painting nature and particularly flowers.  He was imaginative and bold with his choice of colours and his work was well regarded by artists Ranbir Singh Bhist and Little.

A few days before his death, he had composed a couplet that perhaps carried an indication of his passing away.  It read "Akela, Par Abaad kar deta huoon veerana, Bahut Royegi mere jane ka bad shame tanhai." ["Alone, but I enlive the solitude.  Lonely evenings will greatly mourn my departure."]

His work on nawabi adab (etiquette in the time of Nawabs) remained incomplete due to his untimely death.

Contribution 

Giving a new dimension to Hindi reporting Surendra is to be credited for introducing a style of simple and effective prose.  He encouraged Hindi journalists to shed off their inhibition of the reporters accredited to English dailies and magazines.

Notes

References 

1929 births
1977 deaths
Indian male journalists
20th-century Indian journalists
Journalists from Chhattisgarh